The Dhofar Rebellion, also known as the Dhofar War or the Omani Civil War, was waged from 1963 to 1976 in the province of Dhofar against the Sultanate of Muscat and Oman. The war began with the formation of the Dhofar Liberation Front, a Marxist group which aimed to create an independent state in Dhofar, free from the rule of the Omani Sultan Said bin Taimur. The rebels also held the broader goals of Arab nationalism which included ending British influence in the Persian Gulf region. Omani and British goals, on the other hand, were to safeguard Oman from communism and halt the spread of communist ideology as part of the broader Cold War.

The war initially took the form of a low level insurgency with guerrilla warfare being used against Omani forces and the foreign presence in the country. A number of factors such as the British withdrawal from Aden and support from China and the Soviet Union brought the rebels increased success, with the communists controlling the entirety of the Jebel region by the late 1960s. The 1970 Omani coup d'état led to the overthrow of Sultan Said bin Taimur by his reformist son Qaboos bin Said who was backed by a major British military intervention in the conflict. The British initiated a "hearts and minds" campaign to counter the communist rebels and began the process of modernising the Sultan of Oman's Armed Forces while simultaneously deploying the Special Air Service to conduct anti-insurgency operations against the rebels. This approach led to a string of victories against the rebels and was boosted by the Shah of Iran's intervention in the conflict to support the Sultanate of Oman in 1973. The war ended with the final defeat of the rebels in 1976.

Background
In 1962, Oman was a very underdeveloped country. Sultan Said bin Taimur, an absolute ruler under British influence, had outlawed almost all technological development and relied on British support to maintain the rudimentary functions of the state. Dhofar itself was a dependency of Oman but was culturally and linguistically distinct from Oman proper.

The province of Dhofar consists of an intermittent narrow, fertile coastal plain, on which stand Salalah, the provincial capital, and other towns such as Mughsayl, Taqah, and Mirbat. Behind this are the rugged hills of the Jebel Dhofar. The western portion of this range is known as the Jebel Qamar, the central part as the Jebel Qara and the eastern part as the Jebel Samhan. From June to September each year, the jebel receives moisture-laden winds (the Khareef or monsoon) and is shrouded in cloud. As a result, it is heavily vegetated, and for much of the year is green and lush. The inhabitants of the villages and communities on the jebel are known as jibalis (hill people). To the north, the hills slope down via rough wadis and cliffs into the gravel plains and sand seas of the Empty Quarter.

History

Early years of the rebellion

In 1962 a dissatisfied tribal leader, Musallam bin Nufl (Mussalim bin Nafl), formed the Dhofar Liberation Front (DLF) and obtained arms and vehicles from Saudi Arabia. Saudi Arabia and Oman had earlier clashed over ownership of the Buraimi Oasis, and the Saudis had already supported two failed insurrections in the Jebel Akhdar in the interior of Oman in 1957–59. The DLF also received support from Imam Ghalib Bin Ali, the exiled Imam of Oman, who had led these earlier revolts.

Bin Nufl and his men made an epic crossing of the Empty Quarter to reach Dhofar. As early as December 1962, Bin Nufl's guerrilla band performed sabotage operations on the British air base at Salalah and ambushed oil industry vehicles.

From 1964 the DLF began a campaign of hit-and-run attacks on oil company installations and government posts. Many of the DLF were trained former soldiers of the Sultan of Oman's Armed Forces (SAF), or of the Trucial Oman Scouts in the United Arab Emirates.

The Sultan had relied on the "Dhofar Force", a locally recruited irregular unit of only 60 men, to maintain order in the region. In April 1966, members of this unit attempted to assassinate the Sultan. This event apparently changed the nature of the conflict. The Sultan retired to his palace in Salalah, never to be seen in public again. This only served to add to rumours that the British were running Oman through a "phantom" Sultan. The Sultan also launched a full-scale military offensive against the DLF, contrary to the advice of his British advisors. Heavy-handed search and destroy missions were launched in Dhofar, villages were burned and wells were concreted over or blown up. A member of the SAF reported that after receiving heavy resistance, it "proved that the position was unattainable, and after blowing up the village wells we evacuated the camp."

An emboldened movement
From the early days of the rebellion, Nasserite and other left wing movements in the neighbouring Aden Protectorate, later the Protectorate of South Arabia, were also involved. In 1967, two events combined to give the Rebellion a more revolutionary complexion. One was the Israeli victory in the Six-Day War which radicalised opinion throughout the Arab world. The other was the British withdrawal from Aden and the establishment of the People's Democratic Republic of Yemen (PDRY, aka South Yemen). From this point, the rebels had a source of arms, supplies and training facilities adjacent to Dhofar, and fresh recruits from groups in the PDRY. Training camps, logistical bases and other facilities were set up in the coastal town of Hawf, only a few miles from the border with Oman.

The Dhofari liberation movement adopted a Marxist-Leninist ideology with the objective of liberating "all of the Gulf from British imperialism." Political scientist Fred Halliday reported during his visit to the area that "wherever we went we saw people wearing Mao and Lenin badges, reading socialist works and discussing." Works included Lenin's, the German playwright Bertolt Brecht's and of some who were associated with the Palestinian Liberation Organisation (PLO) such as the writer and  strategist Ghassan Kanafani. Discussions were published by Sawt al-Thawra and 9 Yunyu.

Two congresses were held to define the political objectives of the movement, in 1965 and 1968. At the second congress, the Dhofar Liberation Front became the Popular Front for the Liberation of the Occupied Arabian Gulf, or PFLOAG. The program adopted at these two congresses was strongly tinged with communism. Its aim was to establish a "democratic people's republic" and to expel the British army from Oman. The Front sought to establish a constitution, abolish martial law, restore freedom of the press and expression and ensure the rights of minorities. On economic issues, it intended to nationalize the oil companies, develop industries and implement land reform. The Front called for more social justice and affirmed its support for all Asian, African and Latin American liberation movements. References were also made to the Palestinian struggle. The rebels opened schools to which both boys and girls had access (girls' education was forbidden in Oman until 1970). Tribalism was fought against and social relations tended to evolve, with a specific place given to women, including in the armed struggle.

The move towards Marxism–Leninism ensured that the PFLOAG received sponsorship from both South Yemen and China. China in particular was quick to support the PFLOAG as it was a peasant-based organisation, giving it a strong Maoist credibility. Chinese support for the PFLOAG also had another benefit for them, as it acted as a counterbalance to increasing Soviet influence in the Indian Ocean. China was quick to establish an embassy in Aden and "the Yemeni regime allowed its territory to be used for channelling weapons" to the PFLOAG.

The transformation of the DLF, combined with a new supply of Chinese and Soviet weaponry and better training, ensured that the armed wing of the PFLOAG turned into an effective fighting force. In May 1968, an attack by a battalion of the Sultan's Armed Forces against a rebel position at Deefa in the Jebel Qamar was defeated by heavily armed and well-organised and trained rebels.

However, the radicalisation of the rebel movement led to a split between those such as bin Nufl who were fighting mainly for local autonomy and recognition, and the more doctrinaire revolutionaries (led by Mohammad Ahmad al-Ghassani). One of bin Nufl's lieutenants, Said bin Gheer, was an early and influential defector to the Sultan. Nevertheless, by 1969 the DLF and PFLOAG fighters had overrun much of the Jebel Dhofar, and cut the only road across it—that from Salalah to "Midway" (Thumrait) in the deserts to the north. They were known to the Sultan's Armed Forces as Adoo, Arabic for "enemy", or sometimes as "the Front", while they referred to themselves as the People's Liberation Army or PLA. They were well-armed with weapons such as the AK-47 assault rifle and SKS semi-automatic carbine. They also used heavy machine guns (the DShK), mortars up to 82mm in calibre and 140mm BM-14 or 122mm "Katyusha" rockets. By 1970 communists controlled the entire Jebel. Terror was then used to break up the traditional tribal structure. Young men were sent to train for guerilla warfare in China and Russia.

The units of the Sultan's Armed Forces were under strength with only 1,000 men in Dhofar in 1968. They were also badly equipped, mainly with World War II vintage weapons such as bolt-action rifles, which were inferior to the PFLOAG's modern firearms. These rifles were replaced by the FN FAL only late in 1969. Even the SAF's clothing and boots were ragged and unsuitable for the terrain. The units of the SAF were generally not properly trained to face hardy guerrillas on their own ground, and no Omani held a rank above that of Lieutenant (a result of the Sultan's fears of opposition to his rule among the armed forces). The SAF generally were unable to operate in less than company strength on the jebel (making their operations clumsy and conspicuous), and were mainly restricted to Salalah and its immediate area. At various times, small detachments from Nos. 2 (Para), 15 (Field) and 51 (Field) squadrons of the British RAF Regiment, and other units (a Royal Artillery locating troop, a 5.5-inch medium battery of the Royal Jordanian Artillery, and a 25-pounder battery of the Sultan's artillery) had to be deployed to protect the vital airfield at Salalah from infiltrators and from harassing mortar and rocket fire.

Other insurgents in the northern section of Oman formed a separate resistance movement, the National Democratic Front for the Liberation of Oman and the Arabian Gulf (NDFLOAG). In June 1970 they attacked two SAF posts at Nizwa and Izki. They were repulsed but the incident convinced many (including the Sultan's British advisers and backers) that new leadership was required.

1970 Omani coup d'état

In the 1970 Omani coup d'état on 23 July 1970, Said bin Taimur was deposed and went into exile in London. He was replaced by his son, Qaboos bin Said, who immediately instigated major social, educational and military reforms. Qaboos was well educated, first in Salalah by an old Arab scholar and then at Sandhurst, after which he was commissioned into the Cameronians, a regiment of the British Army. He then completed his education sitting in on councils, attending committee meetings and visiting industry and administrative centres in Britain before returning to Oman. His "five point plan" involved:
 A general amnesty to all those of his subjects who had opposed his father;
 An end to the archaic status of Dhofar as the Sultan's private fief and its formal incorporation into Oman as the "southern province";
 Effective military opposition to rebels who did not accept the offer of amnesty;
 A vigorous nationwide programme of development;
 Diplomatic initiatives with the aims of having Oman recognised as a genuine Arab state with its own legal form of government, and isolating the PDRY from receiving support from other Arab states.

Within hours of the coup, British Special Air Service (SAS) soldiers were flown into Oman to further bolster the counterinsurgency campaign. They identified four main strategies that would assist the fight against the PFLOAG:
 Civil administration and a hearts and minds campaign;
 Intelligence gathering and collation;
 Veterinary assistance;
 Medical assistance.

The military commanders on the ground (rather than the UK Ministry of Defence) suggested the implementation of a "hearts and minds" campaign, which would be put into operation primarily by a troop (25 men) from the SAS. The British government (then under Conservative leader Edward Heath) supported this unconventional approach to the counterinsurgency campaign. It approved the deployment of 20 personnel of the British Royal Engineers, who would aid in the construction of schools and health centres, and drilled wells for the population of Dhofar. Royal Army Medical Corps Field Surgical Teams and some  Royal Air Force medical teams would also operate out of Salalah hospital, in order to open a humanitarian front in the conflict. The British government additionally provided monetary support for the creation of the Dhofar Development Programme, whose aim was to wrest support from the PFLOAG through the modernisation of Dhofar. The operation was almost a carbon copy of a system that had proved successful in the Malayan Emergency some twenty years previously.

To assist in the civil development and coordinate it with the military operations, the command structure in Dhofar was reorganised, with the newly appointed Wāli or civilian governor (Braik bin Hamoud) being given equal status to the military commander of the Dhofar Brigade (Brigadier Jack Fletcher to 1972, Brigadier John Akehurst from that date).

A major effort was made to counter rebel propaganda and induce the Dhofari population to support the government. In particular, appeals were made to Islam and to traditional tribal values and customs, against the rebels' secular or materialist teachings. A significant outlet for government propaganda was the many inexpensive Japanese transistor radios which were sold cheaply or distributed free to jibalis who visited Salalah and other government-held towns to sell firewood or vegetables. Although the PFLOAG could also broadcast propaganda by radio, the Government's propaganda was factual and low-key, while that of the rebels, broadcast by Radio Aden, was soon perceived to be exaggerated and stereotyped.

On 27 December 1970 Sultan Qaboos gave an interview to Al Khaleej and commented on the situation in Dhofar saying:

This crisis developed in the past, but its after-effects still exist. And on the very first day [of assuming power] we addressed ourselves to the discontented there, and extended our hand to them saying that what they were complaining about regarding the absence of liberties and services, such as education and health, would end; that it was up to them to come forward and demonstrate their goodwill; that we should co-operate together and that defects inherited from the past needed full time on our part to cope with them.

Government initiatives

One step which had a major impact on the uprising was the announcement of an amnesty for surrendered fighters, and aid in defending their communities from rebels. A cash incentive was offered to rebels who changed sides, with a bonus if they brought their weapon. Following the split between the PFLOAG and DLF wings of the rebel movement, several prominent rebel leaders changed sides, including bin Nufl himself and his deputy, Salim Mubarak, who had commanded the eastern region.

The rebels who defected to the Sultan formed Firqat irregular units, trained by British Army Training Teams, or BATTs, from the Special Air Service. Salim Mubarak played a major role in establishing the first Firqat (and the only one to be formed from members of more than one tribe), but died, apparently of heart failure, shortly after its first successful actions. Eighteen Firqat units, numbering between 50 and 150 men each, were eventually formed. They usually gave themselves names with connections to Islam, such as the Firqat Salahadin or Firqat Khalid bin Walid. (Some of the PFLOAG units also gave themselves ideological names, such as Ho Chi Minh or Che Guevara). These firqat irregular groups played a major part in denying local support to the rebels. Being jibalis themselves (and in many cases with family connections among the communities on the Jebel), they were better at local intelligence-gathering and "hearts and minds" activities than the northern Omani or Baluchi personnel of the regular SAF, although they exasperated commanders of the regular SAF by refusing to take part in operations outside their tribal areas, or during Ramadan.

The first serious step in re-establishing the Sultan's authority on the Jebel took place in October 1971, when Operation Jaguar was mounted, involving five Firqat units. three companies of the SAF and two squadrons of the SAS. After hard fighting, the SAS and Firqats secured an enclave on the eastern Jebel Samhan from which they could expand. The SAS introduced two new weapons to support the mobile but lightly equipped firqats: the rapid firing GPMG, which could lay down a heavier weight of fire than the Bren light machine gun previously available to the SAF, and the Browning M2 heavy machine gun, which was deployed to match the DShK machine guns used by the adoo.

Meanwhile, the regular units of the SAF were expanded and re-equipped. Extra officers and NCO instructors from the British Army and Royal Marines (and also the Pakistan Army) were attached to all units (there were nominally twenty-two British or contracted personnel with each infantry battalion) while Omani personnel were educated and trained to become officers and senior NCOs. British specialist elements, including mortar locating radar troops and artillery observation officers, also rotated through Oman over several years.

The revitalised SAF created fortified lines running north from the coast and up to the summit of the Jebel, to interdict the movement of rebels and the camel trains carrying their supplies from the PDRY. The "Leopard Line" was established in 1971, but this line had to be abandoned during the following monsoon season as it could not be supplied. The more effective "Hornbeam Line" was set up in 1972, running north from Mughsayl on the coast west of Salalah. The lines consisted of fortified platoon and company outposts on commanding peaks, linked by barbed wire. The posts possessed mortars and some also had artillery, to provide cover for patrols and to harass rebel positions and tracks used by them. The SAF soldiers continually sortied from their outposts to set ambushes on the most likely enemy infiltration routes and mount attacks against rebel mortar- and rocket-launching positions. Anti-personnel land mines were sown on infiltration routes. The rebels also used anti-personnel mines against suspected SAF patrol bases, and even laid anti-tank land mines on tracks used by SAF vehicles.

The Sultan of Oman's Air Force was also expanded, acquiring BAC Strikemaster aircraft which provided air support to units on the ground, and eight Shorts Skyvan transport aircraft and eight Agusta Bell 205 transport helicopters which supplied firqat and SAF posts on the jebels. A flight of RAF Westland Wessex helicopters also operated from Salalah.

On 17 April 1972, a battalion of the SAF made a helicopter landing to capture a position codenamed Simba at Sarfait near the border with South Yemen. The captured position overlooked the rebels' supply lines along the coastal plain, but did not block them. Although the demands on its transport aircraft and helicopters to maintain the post at Sarfait forced the SAF to abandon some positions in the eastern Jebel, Sarfait was nevertheless retained for four years.

Rebel counterattacks

Immediately after China established relations with Iran, all support to the rebels in Dhofar was cut off by China which had changed its mind about insurgencies, since it viewed them as counterproductive to countering the Soviets.

As a result of the various measures undertaken by the Omani government, firqats and regular SAF, the rebels were being deprived both of local support and supplies from the PDRY. This was recognised at a Third National Congress of the movement, held in Rakhyut in June 1971. Some military improvements were suggested, such as better discipline to avoid wasteful expenditure of ammunition and better coordination between units. It was acknowledged that the movement had estranged many of the local population, by indiscriminate punishments by "people's courts", the movement's inability to match the government's civil aid program and the effectiveness of the government's information service which promoted Islam over Marxism.

To retrieve the military situation, the rebels mounted a major attack on the coastal town of Mirbat during the monsoon season of 1972. On 19 July 1972, at the Battle of Mirbat, 250 rebel fighters attacked 100 assorted firqat under training, paramilitary askars (armed police) and a detachment of the Special Air Service. In spite of the low khareef cloud cover, air support from Strikemaster aircraft was available, and helicopters landed SAS reinforcements. The rebels were repulsed with heavy losses.

Iranian intervention
As a result of Sultan Qaboos's diplomatic initiatives, the Shah of Iran had sent an Imperial Iranian Army brigade numbering 1,200 and with its own helicopters to assist the Sultan's Armed Forces in 1973. The Iranian brigade first secured the Salalah-Thumrait road, while their helicopters played a vital role in keeping the isolated Simba position supplied. In 1974, the Iranian contribution was expanded into the Imperial Iranian Task Force, numbering 4,000. They attempted to establish another interdiction line, codenamed the "Damavand Line", running from Manston, a few miles east of Sarfait, to the coast near the border with the PDRY. Heavy opposition from the rebels, which included artillery fire from within the PDRY, thwarted this aim for several months. Eventually, the town of Rahkyut, which the PFLO had long maintained as the capital of their liberated territory, fell to the Iranian task force.

Shah Mohamad Reza Pahlavi justified his intervention in Oman by the need to defend the Strait of Hormuz: "Just imagine that these savages should seize the other bank of the Ormuz Straits, at the mouth of the Persian Gulf. Our life depends on that. And those people at war with the Sultan are savages. They may even be worse than communists". Iranian troops remained in the country after the end of the war but were withdrawn after the Iranian revolution.

Final defeat of the rebellion
In January 1974, after several splits and defections, the rebel movement renamed itself the Popular Front for the Liberation of Oman. This public contraction of their aims coincided with a reduction in the support they received from the Soviet Union and China. Meanwhile, the rebels were steadily cleared from the Jebel Qara and Jebel Samhan by firqats and were driven into the western part of the Jebel Qamar.

Nevertheless, the rebels kept the respect of their opponents for their resilience and skill. In January 1975, in the hastily organised Operation Dharab, the SAF attempted to capture the main rebel logistic base in the Shershitti Caves. A SAF company from a battalion which took a wrong route blundered into an ambush in an adoo "killing ground" above the caves and suffered heavy casualties.

During late February 1975, three battalions of the SAF eliminated much of the rebel "9th June" Regiment (named after the anniversary of the outbreak of the rebellion) in the rugged Wadi Ashoq in the Jebel Samhan between the Damavand and Hornbeam lines. This largely restored SAF morale.

During the next few months, the SAF seized an airstrip at Deefa, but were unable to make immediate use of it during the khareef. Some regular troops from the PDRY reinforced the PFLO's fighters, who also deployed SA-7 anti-aircraft missiles for the first time. However, their premature use of this weapon deprived them of the advantage of surprise. Also, the Sultan's Air Force had acquired 31 Hawker Hunter aircraft from the Royal Jordanian Air Force. The SA-7 was much less effective against these aircraft than against Strikemasters.

In October 1975, the SAF launched a final offensive. An attack from Simba, intended to be a diversion, nevertheless succeeded in descending cliffs and slopes  in total height to reach the coast at Dalqhut, and thus finally cut off the adoo from their bases in the PDRY. While the Iranian Task Force threatened the Shershitti Caves from the south, another SAF battalion advanced from Deefa, threatening to surround the remaining adoo territory in the Jebel Qamar. Hawker Hunter aircraft of the Sultan's Air Force attacked artillery positions in the PDRY. Over the next few months, the remaining rebel fighters surrendered or sought sanctuary in the PDRY. The Rebellion was finally declared to be Jebel  defeated in January 1976, although isolated incidents took place as late as 1979.

Aftermath
The British influence was still considerable at the end of the war. The special envoy in Oman of The Times of London explained in 1976:

Most of the civil servants and all the army officers I met, with one single exception, were British. Major General Perkins himself [commander-in-chief of the Omani army] assured us that ’if Great Britain were to withdraw from Oman it would be catastrophic’ […]. Serving in Oman was very useful for the training of officers posted out here. […] It is the only country in the world where you can wage a war like this one, a large-scale war using every kind of weapon".

Foreign involvement

Pakistan
The port city of Gwadar in Balochistan, Pakistan, had been Omani territory until 1958. Baloch troops formed a substantial part of the Sultan's Army. During the rebellion, Oman sought to hire more Baloch troops. The Baluch Students Organization (BSO), a leftist students' organization, expressed solidarity with the Dhofari rebels. In 1979, BSO activist Hameed Baloch tried to shoot at an Omani military officer who was visiting Balochistan to recruit more Baloch troops. The Omani officer was unhurt, and Baloch was convicted by a Pakistani military court and executed.

SAF operating bases
As with many military operations the British were involved in, the use of nicknames was commonplace and these were used alongside local names:

Linear defensive positions
The following were the nicknames of the north-south blocking defences in western Dhofar:
 Damavand Line (Manston to the coast at Rakhyut)
 Hammer Line (between Midway Road and Hornbeam line)
 Hornbeam Line (stretching 53 km north of Mughsayl)

Other sites mentioned not yet identified
The following are mentioned as operational sites but not yet identified:
 Everest
 Furious
 Stonehenge

See also

 Iran–Oman relations
 List of modern conflicts in the Middle East
 Northern Frontier Regiment
 Operation Simba

Notes

References

External links

 GlobalSecurity.org
 British contribution
 Walter C. Ladwig III, "Supporting Allies in Counterinsurgency: Britain and the Dhofar Rebellion," Small Wars & Insurgencies, Vol. 19, No. 1 (March 2008), pp. 62–88.
 "The United Kingdom's last hot war of the Cold War: Oman, 1963–75" by Marc DeVore
 

 
Communism in Oman
Wars involving Iran
Wars involving Oman
Rebellions in Oman
Wars involving Pakistan
1962 in Oman
1976 in Oman
Cold War conflicts
Proxy wars
Pakistan military presence in other countries